Mystère  may refer to:

 Dassault Mystère, a French fighter-bomber
 Martin Mystère, a fictional character
 Mystère (Cirque du Soleil), a Las Vegas circus show
 Mystère (film), a 1983 thriller film
 Mystère (TV miniseries), a 2007 science fiction television miniseries
 Mystère, a 2016 album by the French band La Femme

See also
 Mystere (disambiguation)

ja:神秘
sk:Mystérium